Big History is an American television documentary series narrated by Bryan Cranston, which originally aired on H2 in 2013. It won the 35th Annual News & Documentary Emmy Award for Outstanding Graphic Design and Art Direction.

Each episode covers a single topic from history and shows connections between that topic and various fields of science and social science. Sixteen half-hour episodes aired in the first season, followed by a two-hour finale drawing connections between the sixteen topics. The series has been criticized by Media Life Magazine for its factual inaccuracies.

The series takes its title from a coinage by David Christian who describes Big History as an emerging academic discipline and approach to history that is less interested in wars and monarchs than it is in the way events are connected thematically and even molecularly, all the way back to the Big Bang.

List of Big History episodes

Emmy Award 
The 35th Annual News & Documentary Emmy Award for Outstanding Graphic Design and Art Direction was awarded to the team of Flight 33 Productions:

Creative Director Steffen Schlachtenhaufen

Art Directors Dominique Navarro, Chris Ramirez

Visual Effects Supervisors Matt Drummond, Christopher Gaal, John R. McConnell

Compositors Dean Guiliotis, Carter Higgins, Brad Moylan, Ian Pauly

Lead 3D Visual Effects Artist Michael Ranger

3D Artist Scott Bell, Jennie Bozic, Keith Yakouboff, Sebastiano D’Aprile, Mario Cardona

Lead FX Artist Nico Sugleris

References

2013 American television series debuts
2013 American television series endings
2010s American documentary television series
H2 (A&E networks) original programming
Medieval documentaries
Big History